The eleventh and most recent season of the American sitcom television series Frasier originally aired from September 23, 2003, to May 13, 2004, on NBC. The opening title screen color was changed to gold.

Cast

Main
 Kelsey Grammer as Frasier Crane
 Jane Leeves as Daphne Crane
 David Hyde Pierce as Niles Crane
 Peri Gilpin as Roz Doyle
 John Mahoney as Martin Crane

Special guest

Recurring
Patrick Kerr as Noel Shempsky
Tom McGowan as Kenny
Ashley Thomas as Alice
Edward Hibbert as Gil Chesterton

Guest

Guest caller
Benjamin Bratt as Kevin
Stanley Tucci as Morrie
Penny Marshall as Celeste
Estelle Parsons as Celeste's Mother	
Hilary Duff as Britney
Helen Mirren as Babette

Episodes

Reception 
The season ranked 35th in the seasonal ratings and had an average viewership of  10.920 million viewers.

Notes

References 

2003 American television seasons
2004 American television seasons
Frasier 11